Luiz Virgilio "Virgulino" Castro de Moura (Rio de Janeiro, August 23, 1952) is a retired Brazilian judoka. He was a seven time national champion and represented Brazil at the 1980 Summer Olympics and 1981 World Judo Championships. He is considered one of the most renowned Brazilian judokas in the 1980s.

Biography
A trainee under Georges Mehdi, Castro competed many years while served in Brazilian military. He amassed a number of championship wins both in and outside Brazil, winning seven times the national championship at the weigh categories of médio and meio-pessado. Eventually he was elected for the Brazilian Olympic team and represented the country at 1980 in Moscow, where he had a victory over Tsancho Atanasov and a loss to Jean-Luc Rougé. He would compete at the World Championships in Maastricht the next year, losing to the legendary Yasuhiro Yamashita. He then retired and opened a judo academy, closing shortly after in order to become a businessman. In 2014, he returned for the World Veterans Championships, placing third. He is uncle to fellow judo champion David Moura.

References

Living people
1952 births
Brazilian male judoka
Olympic judoka of Brazil
Judoka at the 1980 Summer Olympics
Sportspeople from Rio de Janeiro (city)